Dui Purush is a 1978 Bengali drama film directed by Sushil Mukhopadhyay. The film's music was composed by Kalipada Sen.

Plot 
Nutubihari Mukherjee is a freedom fighter who makes many sacrifices when he goes to jail and continues to do good even after his release. However, he turns into a corrupt politician when he gets powerful.

Cast
 Uttam Kumar
 Dilip Roy
 Supriya Choudhury
 Tarun Kumar
 Bikash Roy
 Lily Chakravarty
 Satya Bandyopadhyay
 Kalyani Mondal

References

External links
 
 Dui Purush (1978) in Gomolo

1978 films
Bengali-language Indian films
Films shot in Kolkata
Films set in India
1970s Bengali-language films
Indian drama films
Films based on works by Tarasankar Bandyopadhyay